Daydream of a Photoplay Artist is a 1912 silent film dramatic short starring Francis X. Bushman. It was produced by the Essanay Film Manufacturing Company and distributed through General Film Company.

Cast
Francis X. Bushman

See also
Francis X. Bushman filmography

References

External links
 Daydream of a Photoplay Artist at IMDb.com

1912 films
American silent short films
Essanay Studios films
Silent American drama films
1912 drama films
American black-and-white films
1910s American films